All Saints Church of England Academy, Plymouth is an academy school and business and enterprise college that opened in September 2010 on the existing John Kitto Community College site on Honicknowle Lane in Pennycross, Plymouth, England near the A38.

The Academy opened on the existing John Kitto site, with new premises being built and opened in 2013.

References

External links

Academies in Plymouth, Devon
Educational institutions established in 2010
2010 establishments in England
Church of England secondary schools in the Diocese of Exeter
Secondary schools in Plymouth, Devon
Christian schools in England